Razzmatazz was a music-based children's television programme that ran on ITV between 2 June 1981 and 2 January 1987.

Razzmatazz was produced by Tyne Tees Television for Children's ITV and featured presenters Alastair Pirrie and Lyn Spencer. Later presenters included Brendan Healy, Suzanne Dando and singer Lisa Stansfield, who joined the show when she was 16.

The show featured the latest pop acts performing their current single, interspersed with games and other items such as cooking. The show was recorded in Newcastle with the audience largely made up of pupils from nearby schools. Acts featured on the show included Kate Bush, David Essex, Chas and Dave, Adam and the Ants, Altered Images, Dead or Alive, Lynsey de Paul, Madness, Kim Wilde, Bucks Fizz, Seona Dancing and General Public.

Episodes
Series 1: 13 editions – 2 June 1981 – 25 August 1981
New Year Special – 1 January 1982
Series 2: 13 editions 5 February 1982 – 7 May 1982
Series 3: 16 editions – 14 September 1982 – 31 December 1982
Series 4: 13 editions – 5 April 1983 – 28 June 1983
Rock & Pop Awards Special – 19 July 1983
Series 5: 14 editions – 1 November 1983 – 8 February 1984
Series 6: 14 editions – 11 April 1984 – 18 July 1984
Series 7: 14 editions – 24 October 1984 –  30 January 1985
Series 8: 14 editions – 27 March 1985 – 14 August 1985
Christmas Special – 23 December 1985
Series 9: 12 editions 11 June 1986 – 3 September 1986
Christmas Special – 17 December 1986
New Year Special – 2 January 1987

References

External links

ITV children's television shows
1980s British children's television series
1981 British television series debuts
1987 British television series endings
Television series by ITV Studios
Television shows produced by Tyne Tees Television
English-language television shows
1980s British music television series
Pop music television series